Sniper Special Ops is a 2016 American war action drama film written and directed by Fred Olen Ray and starring Steven Seagal, who also serves as executive producer for the film. It is unrelated to the long-running Sniper film series.

Plot
Sergeant Jake Chandler (Steven Seagal), an expert sniper, joins Sergeant Vic Mosby (Tim Abell) with the Delta Force during an overwatch mission to extract an American Congressman who is being held by the Taliban in a remote Afghan village. At first, the rescue mission is a success until Jake gets separated after a firefight with the enemy and stays behind to help a soldier who had been injured in battle. Mosby tries to convince Lieutenant Colonel Jackson (Dale Dye) to let him go back for his fellow soldiers, but is instead ordered to retrieve munitions which could be vital for the base. Vic and his Special Ops Team violate orders and head back to the village to rescue the stranded soldiers.

Cast

Reception
Sniper Special Ops has a rating of 16% on Rotten Tomatoes.

References

External links
 
 Review of film at Filmink

2016 films
2016 action drama films
2010s action war films
2010s war drama films
2010s English-language films
American films about revenge
American action drama films
American action war films
American war drama films
Films directed by Fred Olen Ray
2010s American films